Quaker Steak & Lube is a casual dining restaurant chain based in Bloomsburg, Pennsylvania. It was founded in 1974, in Sharon, Pennsylvania. The original restaurant was built by George "Jig" Warren and Gary "Mo" Meszaros in an abandoned gas station in downtown Sharon, and decorated with license plates and old automobiles. Originally, a "cook your own steak" establishment, Quaker Steak is currently known for its chicken wings and proprietary dipping sauces.

History
In 1974, gas stations across the country were closing in the aftermath of the 1973 oil crisis. George "Jig" Warren III and Gary "Moe" Meszaros came up with the idea of preserving the culture of old gas stations and high-powered muscle cars. They opened Quaker Steak & Lube, initially a "cook-your-own-steak" restaurant that features old muscle cars. The original location includes a 1936 Chevrolet on the original hydraulic grease rack.

On November 16, 2015, immediately after filing for Chapter 11 bankruptcy, the company was acquired by TravelCenters of America, which planned to expand the chain both in its chain of truck stops as well as in standalone locations. JDK Management purchased Quaker Steak & Lube from TravelCenters for $5 million in early 2021.

Awards
The restaurant has received over 70 awards in various national and regional competitions as of 2023.

Media
The Pointe at North Fayette location in Pittsburgh, Pennsylvania was featured in the Travel Channel series Man v. Food. The episode's challenge was to consume six "Atomic" chicken wings, the hottest wings on Quaker Steak's menu at the time. Host Adam Richman completed the challenge in the allotted time and was awarded a commemorative bumper sticker and a place on the restaurant's "Atomic Wall of Flame".

References

External links
 

Regional restaurant chains in the United States
Restaurants established in 1974
Steakhouses in the United States
Cuisine of the Mid-Atlantic states
Restaurants in Pennsylvania
Privately held companies based in Pennsylvania
1974 establishments in Pennsylvania
Sharon, Pennsylvania
Columbia County, Pennsylvania
American companies established in 1974